Gregory James Qaiyum (born February 7, 1976), better known by his initials GQ, is an American actor, writer and rapper.

The son of an American mother of German and English descent and a Pakistani father, GQ was raised in Chicago, where he attended Loyola Academy (high school), and later studied at New York University's (NYU) Tisch School of the Arts. Before graduating from the Experimental Theatre Wing of NYU, he put some friends together to create his senior project, merging hip hop and theater, combining two of his passions, rapping and acting. The result is off-Broadway production The Bomb-itty of Errors, in which GQ is actor, rapper, co-writer and original producer. The show won the jury prize for Best Show at the 2001 Aspen Comedy Festival.

GQ's first professional acting job was at the Manhattan Theatre Club in the hit London play, East is East. His film credits include What's the Worst That Could Happen?, On the Line, Drumline, and Taxi.

After his experience in theater, GQ turned his attention to television: a musical sketch/comedy series for MTV called Scratch & Burn. He and the other members of the Bomb-itty crew, including his younger brother, JAQ (who also wrote and produced all of the music for the show), created, wrote and starred in the series.

GQ's next project was his directorial debut for a film for Showtime called Just Another Story, which he wrote and starred in as well. GQ also guest-starred on Fox's Boston Public, writing his own rhymes for a role as a delinquent student in a Shakespeare class who brought the material to life for the other bored students by rapping it.

In 2012, the Q Brothers debuted their newest Shakespeare adaptation, Othello: The Remix, a 90-minute hip-hop version of Othello that was part of the Globe to Globe Festival and World Shakespeare Festival.

GQ lives in Los Angeles. Alongside his brother JAQ, the two have created Q Brothers Productions and are working together on an album, The Feel Good Album Of The Year, a mix of jazz, rock, R&B and electronica.

Selected filmography

References

External links
 Official website
 

1976 births
Male actors from Chicago
American male film actors
American male television actors
American people of German descent
American people of English descent
American people of Pakistani descent
American rappers
Living people
Tisch School of the Arts alumni
21st-century American rappers